Parallel Lives is a series of biographies by Plutarch.

Parallel Lives may also refer to:
 Parallel Lives (anthology), a novella collection
 Parallel Lives (film), a telefilm
 Parallel Lives (album), an album by Nothing's Carved in Stone